The 1923 Bremen state election was held on 18 November 1923 to elect the 120 members of the Bürgerschaft of Bremen.

Results

References 

Bremen
1923
November 1923 events in Europe